Martin John Winbolt-Lewis (born 14 November 1946) is a British sprinter. He competed in the men's 400 metres at the 1968 Summer Olympics.

He also represented England and won a bronze medal in the 4 x 440 yards relay, at the 1966 British Empire and Commonwealth Games in Kingston, Jamaica. Four years later he represented England again and competed in the 800 metres, at the 1970 British Commonwealth Games in Edinburgh, Scotland.

References

1946 births
Living people
Athletes (track and field) at the 1966 British Empire and Commonwealth Games
Athletes (track and field) at the 1968 Summer Olympics
Athletes (track and field) at the 1970 British Commonwealth Games
English male sprinters
English male middle-distance runners
British male sprinters
British male middle-distance runners
Olympic athletes of Great Britain
Place of birth missing (living people)
Universiade silver medalists for Great Britain
Universiade medalists in athletics (track and field)
Commonwealth Games medallists in athletics
Commonwealth Games bronze medallists for England
Medallists at the 1966 British Empire and Commonwealth Games